In cricket, the boundary is the perimeter of a playing field. It is also the term given to a scoring shot where the ball is hit to, or beyond, that perimeter, which generally earns four or six runs for the batting team.

Edge of the field
The boundary is the edge of the playing field, or the physical object (often a rope) marking the edge of the field. In low-level matches, a series of plastic cones are sometimes used. Since the early 2000s, the boundaries at professional matches are often a series of padded cushions carrying sponsors' logos strung along a rope. If one of these is accidentally moved during play (such as by a fielder sliding into the rope in an attempt to stop the ball) the boundary is considered to remain at the point where that object first stood. The boundary is at least  from the centre of the field in men's international cricket, and at least  from the centre of the field in women's international cricket. 

When the cricket ball is inside the boundary, it is live. When the ball is touching the boundary, grounded beyond the boundary, or being touched by a fielder who is himself either touching the boundary or grounded beyond it, it is dead and the batting side usually scores four or six runs for hitting the ball over the boundary. Because of this rule, fielders near the boundary attempting to intercept the ball while running or diving often flick the ball back in to the field of play rather than pick it up directly, because their momentum could carry them beyond the rope while holding the ball. They then return to the field to pick the ball up and throw it back to the bowler.

A law change in 2010 declared that a fielder could not jump from behind the boundary and, while airborne, parry the ball back on to the field.

Scoring runs
A boundary is the scoring of four or six runs from a single delivery, with the ball having left the field, and its first bounce having occurred either entirely within the playing field (in the case of four runs) or not (six runs); these events are known as a four or a six respectively.

Occasionally there is an erroneous use of the term boundary as a synonym for a "four". For example, sometimes commentators say such as "There were seven boundaries and three sixes in the innings." The correct terminology would be "There were ten boundaries in the innings of which seven were fours and three were sixes."

When this happens the runs are automatically added to the batsman's and his team's score and the ball becomes dead. If the ball did not touch the bat or a hand holding the bat, four runs are scored as the relevant type of extra instead; six runs cannot be scored as extras, even if the ball clears the boundary, which is in any case extremely unlikely.

Any runs the batsmen completed by running before the ball reached the edge of the field do not count, unless they are greater than the number of runs that would be scored by the boundary, in which case it is the runs from the boundary that are discounted.

The scoring of a four or six by a good aggressive shot displays a certain amount of mastery by the batsman over the bowler, and is usually greeted by applause from the spectators.  Fours resulting from an edged stroke, or from a shot that did not come off as the batsman intended, are considered bad luck to the bowler.  As a batsman plays himself in and becomes more confident as his innings progresses, the proportion of his runs scored in boundaries often rises.

An average first-class match usually sees between 50 and 150 boundary fours. Sixes are less common, and usually fewer than 10 (and sometimes none) will be scored in the course of a match.

The Laws allow for captains to change the boundary allowances (number of runs scored through either type of boundary) through a pre-match agreement.

Four runs
Four runs are scored if the ball bounces, or rolls along the ground, before touching or going over the edge of the field. If it does not touch the edge of the field, it must touch the ground beyond it. For example, a batsman hits the ball and it bounces before the boundary and carries over the boundary in flight, a fielder can still bring the ball back into the field of play as long as any part of the fielder's body does not touch the ground outside of the boundary.

Four runs are scored as overthrows if a fielder gathers the ball and then throws it so that no other fielder can gather it before it reaches the boundary. In this case, the batsman who hit the ball scores however many runs the batsmen had run up to that time, plus four additional runs, and it is counted as a boundary. If the ball has not come off the bat or hand holding the bat, then the runs are classified as 'extras' and are added to the team's score but not to the score of any individual batsman.

Four runs (or more) can also be scored by hitting the ball into the outfield and running between the wickets.  Four runs scored in this way is referred to as an "all run four" and is not counted as a boundary.

Six runs 
Six runs are scored if the ball does not bounce before passing over the boundary in the air, and then touches the boundary or the ground beyond it.

Prior to 1910, six runs were only awarded for hits out of the ground, with five runs awarded for clearing the boundary.

Records

Sixes

The record for most sixes in a Test match innings is 12, which was achieved by Pakistani all-rounder Wasim Akram during an innings of 257 not out against Zimbabwe in October 1996 at Sheikhupura. The One Day International record for most sixes hit in an innings is held by Eoin Morgan, who hit 17 sixes against Afghanistan at Old Trafford on 18 June 2019 in his innings of 148 off 71 balls.
Brendon McCullum (retired) and Ben Stokes currently hold the record for most sixes in a Test career with 107. Shahid Afridi holds the record for most sixes in an ODI career (351 in 398 matches, 369 innings, on his retirement). Indian Gully Cricketer(Anna Nagar) Manimaran holds the record for the longest six in the cricket history (unofficially 160m) though later the distance was recorded 120 meters in ICC Records Book. 

Australia’s Brett Lee's longest six has an official record in the history of cricket world. His tremendous performance has crossed the rope by some approx 130-135 meters that was achieved in 2005 against West Indies in one of the test match at Gabba. 
The record for the most sixes in a Test match is 27, which occurred during a 2006 Test match between Pakistan and India at the Iqbal Stadium in Faisalabad. In their first innings, Pakistan hit eleven sixes. India hit nine in their first innings. Pakistan hit seven more sixes in their second innings.

The record for most sixes in a One Day International is 46, which was achieved in a match between West Indies and England at St George's on 27 February 2019. England hit 24 and West Indies hit 22 sixes. The equivalent record in Twenty20 Internationals was set on the AMI Stadium, 24 sixes were hit during the Twenty20 International match between India and New Zealand on 25 February 2009.

In 2012, during the First Test against Bangladesh in Dhaka, West Indies cricketer Chris Gayle became the first player to hit a six off the first ball in a Test cricket match.

Six or more sixes in an over

Six or more sixes in an over in top level domestic cricket
, this feat has occurred seven times in top level domestic cricket.

Six sixes in an over in international cricket
As of September 2021, this feat has occurred four times in international cricket. No batsman has achieved this feat in  Tests.

Notes
  On 31 August 1968, Sobers became the first man to hit six sixes off a single six-ball over in first-class cricket. The over was bowled by Malcolm Nash in Nottinghamshire's first innings against Glamorgan at St Helen's in Swansea. Nash was a seam bowler but decided to try his arm at spin bowling. This achievement was caught on film.
 On 10 January 1985, Bombay's Shastri equalled Sobers' record of hitting six sixes in an over in first-class cricket, off the bowling of Baroda's Tilak Raj, at the  Wankhede.
 On 23 July 2017, Worcestershire's Whiteley hit six sixes off six legal deliveries plus one wide to take the total number of runs in that over to 37 off bowler Karl Carver of Yorkshire at Headingley during a NatWest T20 Blast match.
 On 14 October 2018, Zazai hit six sixes in an over off the bowling of Abdullah Mazari for Kabul Zwanan in a match against Balkh Legends in the 2018–19 Afghanistan Premier League, in Sharjah.
 On 5 January 2020, in the 2019–20 Super Smash match between Canterbury and Northern Districts in Christchurch, Carter hit six sixes in one over off the bowling of Anton Devcich.
 On 29 March 2021, in the 2020–21 Major Clubs Limited Over Tournament match between Sri Lanka Army Sports Club and Bloomfield Cricket and Athletic Club at the Army Ground in Panagoda, Army Sports Club's captain Perera hit six sixes in one over off the bowling of Dilhan Cooray. This was the second instance in a List A match, and first in a domestic match.
 On 28 November 2022, Gaikwad became the first batsman to hit seven sixes in an over, for Maharashtra against Uttar Pradesh in the second quarter-final of the Vijay Hazare Trophy in Ahmedabad. The bowler was Shiva Singh.
 On 16 March 2007, in a match between South Africa and the Netherlands in Basseterre at the 2007 Cricket World Cup, Gibbs became the first person to hit six sixes off an over in a One Day International match. The over was bowled by Dutch leg-spinner Daan van Bunge.
 On 19 September 2007, during a match between England and India in the inaugural T20 World Cup, Singh became the first batsman to hit six sixes in an over in a T20 International, in an over bowled by Stuart Broad.
 On 3 March 2021, West Indian captain Pollard hit six sixes in an over off the bowling of Akila Dananjaya in the first T20I between Sri Lanka and the West Indies at the Coolidge Cricket Ground.
 On 9 September 2021, Malhotra of the United States hit six sixes in one over, off the bowling of Papua New Guinea's Gaudi Toka in Muscat, becoming the second cricketer to achieve this in ODIs. He became the first USA batsman to make an ODI century.

See also 
 Home run - similar to a six.

References

Cricket terminology
Cricket laws and regulations